Indiana State Police Pension Trust v. Chrysler LLC was a lawsuit brought in United States federal court June 2009 by several pension funds against Chrysler LLC and the United States Department of the Treasury, to block the planned sale of Chrysler LLC assets to a "New Chrysler" entity in the Chrysler bankruptcy.

The case arose from the high-profile bankruptcy of Chrysler, in which the U.S. Treasury orchestrated a sale under Section 363 of the Bankruptcy Code to avoid the debtors' having to fully compensate a group of first lien priority creditors, which included roughly 100,000 retired teachers and police officers from Indiana.  The United Auto Workers Union (UAW), which was closely allied with the Obama Administration, was a junior, unsecured creditor who stood to gain from the plan of sale.

The plaintiff (pensioners) asked for the U.S. Treasury's redistribution of value in the bankruptcy from senior, secured creditors with priority liens to junior, unsecured creditors to be struck down, and also argued that the Emergency Economic Stabilization Act of 2008 (EESA) authorizes the federal government to use TARP (Troubled Asset Relief Program) moneys [sic] only to "bail out" financial institutions and not automakers.

In Dec 2008, Congress declined to authorize the Auto industry bailout bill. 

The defendant (U.S. Government) asked to allow the bankruptcy plan to proceed, noting that the needs of the economy outweigh the needs of the deal's detractors. Government lawyers defended the use of funds from TARP and argued that Indiana's appeal lacked legal merit.

The sale had been ordered to proceed by the decision in the United States Bankruptcy Court for the Southern District of New York. The order was appealed by the pensioners to the United States Court of Appeals for the Second Circuit, and from there to the United States Supreme Court, who decided not to hear the case, and dropped the stay allowing the asset sale to proceed. As a result of the sale the United Auto Workers Union (UAW) gained a 55 percent ownership stake in the automaker.

Six months later the Supreme Court vacated the lower court's ruling, thereby ensuring that the controversial opinion would retain no precedential value going forward; no ruling was issued to explain the Court's actions.

Background

Chrysler LLC and General Motors both carried a substantial debt and interest-cost burden that would make restructuring for future viability difficult, unless bondholders' claims were reduced or exchanged for equity by agreement. The original U.S. government plan was for both companies to enter a Chapter 11 bankruptcy, obtain critical agreements from most stakeholders, and minimize objections, allowing the companies to  exit the bankruptcy process without a prolonged battle with stakeholders affected by the filing.  Fiat's agreement permitted Fiat to decline to consummate the proposed partnership with the new Chrysler Group company if it were not completed by June 15, 2009, which in turn could force the liquidation of all Chrysler assets.

Four major U.S. financial institutions (including JP Morgan Chase and Bank of America) which had received Troubled Asset Relief Program (TARP) bailout funds from the U.S. federal government held 70 percent of the Chrysler bonds, and agreed to the proposed deal of 33 cents on the dollar.  
The remaining holders of the debt formed a group known as the Committee of Chrysler Non-Tarp Lenders that accused the TARP bondholders of having a conflict of interest.

Under federal government pressure, most key members of the Non-TARP Lenders acceded to a bankruptcy agreement, raising the total of bondholders agreeing to 92 percent. 
However, since not all stakeholders had agreed before the deadline, Chrysler filed for bankruptcy on April 30, 2009. In the bankruptcy court, the U.S. government lowered the debt exchange offer to 29 cents on the dollar. The Indiana State Police funds, plaintiffs in the lawsuit, had obtained their Chrysler bonds in July 2008 at 43 cents per dollar of face value.

Case overview
The plaintiffs claim that the Department of the Treasury treated Chrysler's secured creditors in a manner that is contrary to that called for under U.S. bankruptcy law. Indiana State Treasurer Richard Mourdock originally filed a motion in the New York's federal bankruptcy court to stop the pending sale of Chrysler; it was rejected along with 300 other motions when the court order for the sale was issued.

On Friday, May 29, 2009, the Indiana group's motion was rejected, and on Sunday, May 31, 2009, bankruptcy Judge Arthur J. Gonzalez approved a proposed government restructuring plan and sale of Chrysler's assets that allowed most of the assets of Chrysler to be purchased by the new entity.  The plaintiffs appealed to the United States Court of Appeals for the Second Circuit, which affirmed the sale on June 5, 2009. The Second Circuit, however, stayed its decision, pending possible review by the Supreme Court, until 4 P.M. Monday, June 8, 2009. Fiat was to receive 20% of the new Chrysler entity, and have the future option of purchasing equity up to an additional 15% of the company.
The autoworker's union retirement health care trust (voluntary benefit association "VEBA") would get 55%, and the U.S. Government and Canadian government would be minority stakeholders.

On Sunday (June 7), the Indiana State Police Pension Fund, the Indiana Teacher's Retirement Fund, and the state's Major Moves Construction Fund filed a petition with the U.S. Supreme Court requesting an emergency stay to delay the sale while they challenged the deal.  The funds argued that the sale went against U.S. bankruptcy law because it unlawfully rewarded unsecured creditors ahead of secured creditors since, under the proposed sale, Fiat would not initially contribute cash, but would instead contribute its vehicle platforms to the New Chrysler in exchange for its equity share.
Chrysler estimated the market value of Fiat's proposed contribution to be as much as US$8 to 10 billion.  The pension funds also challenged the constitutionality of using funds from the Troubled Asset Relief Program to pay for the Chrysler bailout, and claimed that Congress never gave approval for the funds to be used in that manner.

Fiat had the right to withdraw from participation in the "New Chrysler" if the deal did not close by June 15. However, the head of Fiat said it "would never walk away" from the Chrysler deal, even if it did not close by June 15. If Fiat did abandon the deal, since there is no other known entity willing to participate in the purchase of Chrysler assets as a block, the liquidation of all Chrysler assets would ensue. In briefs filed at the Supreme Court, the administration of U.S. President Barack Obama supported the completion of the asset sale .

On Monday, June 8, 2009, Supreme Court Associate Justice Ruth Bader Ginsburg, presiding over emergency motions arising from the Second Circuit, issued a temporary stay in a one-sentence order, pending a further order by her or by the Supreme Court.

Supreme Court declines to hear the case
On Tuesday, June 9, 2009, the Supreme Court declined to hear the case.  It issued a per curiam denial of the applications for a stay of the sale from the three Indiana funds, allowing the sale of assets to "New Chrysler" to proceed. It did not discuss the underlying issues raised, and its opinion cautioned that its denial of the stay was not a judgment on the underlying merits. According to the two-page decision and order, the Indiana funds "have not carried the burden" of demonstrating that the Supreme Court was required.  The U.S. Department of the Treasury then issued a statement saying: "We are gratified that not a single court that reviewed this matter, including the U.S. Supreme Court, found any fault whatsoever with the handling of this matter by either Chrysler or the U.S. government."

On Wednesday, June 10, 2009, the sale of most of Chrysler assets to "New Chrysler" (formally known as Chrysler Group LLC) was completed. As had been proposed, Fiat received equity in the New Chrysler through its contribution of automobile platforms as a base for a new line of Chrysler cars. The federal government financed the deal with the US$6.6 billion in financing that it had paid to the "Old Chrysler", formally called Chrysler LLC.
The transfer did not include eight manufacturing locations, nor many parcels of real estate, nor equipment leases. Contracts with 789 U.S. auto dealerships, which are being dropped by Chrysler, were not transferred.

As a result of the asset sale the United Auto Workers Union (UAW) gained a 55 percent ownership stake in the automaker.

Supreme Court vacates the underlying Second Circuit opinion
On December 14, 2009, the Supreme Court granted the cert petition in Indiana State Police Pension Trust v. Chrysler LLC and vacated the underlying Second Circuit opinion, but remanded the case with instructions to dismiss the appeal as moot.
While the Court had declined to hear the case on June 9 which allowed the Obama administration's wealth redistribution BK plan to proceed without ruling on its merits, its Dec 14 action effectively de-legitimized the BK plan, yet the Court did not issue a ruling to explain its actions. This was far from the ideal outcome for the Indiana pensioners who sought equitable relief from the high court, but the vacatur of a flawed lower court decision is nevertheless an important development that will maintain the integrity of bankruptcy law going forward.

Opinions on the case

Plaintiff (Indiana pension group) argument
During a May 29, 2009 interview with Human Events, Mourdock said, "This is the first time in the history of American bankruptcy law when secured creditors received less than unsecured creditors." Mourdock also stated, "The Chrysler deal is a clear violation of the Fifth Amendment to the Constitution and more than 150 years of bankruptcy law." Mourdock also stated that under the Fifth Amendment, private property cannot "be taken without due process of law. That clearly has not happened in this case. There has been no process of law consistent with long-standing precedent whatsoever."

On May 26, 2009, while speaking in front of U.S. District Judge Thomas Griesa, Mourdock stated, "As fiduciaries, we can't allow our retired police officers and teachers to be ripped off by the federal government. The Indiana state funds suffered losses when the Obama administration overturned more than 100 years of established law by redefining 'secured creditors' to mean something less ... The court filing is aimed not only at recouping those losses but also reasserting the rule of law ..."

During a May 21, 2009, interview with Reuters, Mourdock stated, "They bought according to the rules, and then the rules got changed," and, "Our portfolios are no longer going to buy the secured debt of American corporations that are accepting bailout monies. It is an unacceptable risk for us to purchase that debt."

Defendant (U.S. government) argument
Chrysler said in a statement that Mr. Mourdock, a Republican, was politically motivated and was willing to put Chrysler in liquidation over less than 1 percent of the three funds' assets.

U.S. Solicitor General Elena Kagan, later an Associate Justice of the Supreme Court, defended the use of TARP funds for helping Chrysler, and argued that the pension funds' appeal to block the sale to Fiat lacked legal merit. She said that the losses that the pension funds would incur "cannot outweigh" the potential larger problems that a collapse of Chrysler would create. She wrote, "As an economic matter ... blocking the transaction would undoubtedly have grave consequences." She also said, "The liquidation of Chrysler would have very severe effects on the American and Canadian economies ... More than 38,000 Chrysler employees would lose their jobs; 23 manufacturing facilities and 20 parts depots will be shuttered; more than 3,000 Chrysler dealers would suffer significant and possibly fatal harm to their businesses; and billions of dollars in health and pension benefits for current and former Chrysler workers would be wiped out."

Other responses
U.S. Representative Joe Donnelly (D-Indiana), objecting to the lawsuit, declared, "This claim endangers the present offer made by Chrysler and threatens to provide the pension funds with a much lower return than has already been offered."

U.S. Representative Gary Peters (D-Michigan), with a district that includes Auburn Hills, Michigan, where Chrysler's headquarters is located, said, 

It is quite clear that Indiana's case is not in the best interest of the people of Indiana. Indiana officials are fighting over $4.8 million at the risk of costing their state over $20 million in tax revenue, tens of millions more in related costs and putting 4,000 of their own people out of work.

U.S. Representative John Dingell (D-Michigan), stated, 

By refusing to make the relatively small sacrifices that would avert a calamity. The pension funds will instead create a great catastrophe, which is the same kind of short-sighted thinking that got us into the Great Depression.

Shelly Lombard, a credit analyst and portfolio manager of high yield and distressed corporate securities at Gimme Credit, defended the Treasury Department's actions by saying, "Even though the debt was secured, it was clear the auto industry was very, very troubled at this time ... If it wasn't, it wouldn't have been offered at such a steep discount." Lombard also pointed out that during the current recession, even secured bank debt is not a guarantee. She explained that the market's low price could have been due to a relative lack of buyers or because the debt was faulty. She also compared the transaction to purchasing a house at a bargain price, and stated, "Either there's a divorce and the people just want to get out of there, or the foundation is cracked. In an industry in such turmoil, due diligence becomes even more critical."

Hedge fund managers from Pacific Investment Management, Barclays Capital, Fridson Investment, and Schultze Asset Management Advisors have predicted that the Treasury Department's actions will discourage them from lending money to unionized companies with underfunded pension and medical obligations, such as airlines and auto suppliers. The Financial Times wrote that the Obama administration's treatment of Chrysler's secured creditors "disturbed the security of expectation that has made lenders willing to provide capital as secured credit, thus handicapping all US industry and undermining what has been, for all its flaws, one of the best financial reorganisation processes in the world, now emulated elsewhere."

An editorial in The Economist argued that the Treasury Department's actions could "establish a terrible precedent. Bankruptcy exists to sort legal claims on assets. If it becomes a tool of social policy, who will then lend to struggling firms in which the government has a political interest?"

A Wall St. Journal editorial by James Taranto stated, 

Congress established bankruptcy courts to provide for the orderly restructuring and liquidation of financially distressed companies, and the decisions of these tribunals are subject to review by the ordinary judicial courts. The Obama administration's plan for Chrysler – which involved giving a politically favored constituency (the United Auto Workers) priority at the expense of both taxpayers and legally privileged secured creditors – was an effort to circumvent the rule of law.

Former U.S. Speaker of the House Newt Gingrich wrote, 

In a rigged proceeding in which the federal government disregarded bankruptcy law in favor of the political outcome it desired, the Chrysler bankruptcy laid the predicate for the much larger General Motors bankruptcy to come. Against law and precedent, the unions were moved to the front of the line when it came to who would benefit from the bankruptcy. The Obama Treasury Department strong-armed Chrysler's creditors into a deal in which the UAW was given 55 percent ownership of the company while Chrysler's secured creditors – investors who would have received priority in a non-political bankruptcy proceeding – were left with just 29 cents on the dollar.

Francis Cianfrocca, the CEO of Bayshore Networks, wrote,

The administration's management of the Chrysler bankruptcy has led to an astonishingly reckless abrogation of contract law that will introduce a new level of uncertainty into business transactions at all levels, and make wealth generation more difficult going forward ... An extraordinary uncertainty has been created when the most powerful man in the world can rewrite contracts and choose winners and losers in private negotiations as he sees fit. Since this is an unquantifiable uncertainty, and not a quantifiable risk, its effect on business and investor confidence will be large and unpredictable. As in the 1930s, a time when government also cavalierly rewrote private contracts, the prudent approach for business will be to invest minimally and wait for another administration.

Governor of Indiana Mitch Daniels wrote an Op-Ed in the Wall Street Journal just before the one year anniversary of the Court's reversal of the underlying Second Circuit ruling:

But thanks to a quiet correction by the Supreme Court — and a little Hoosier stubbornness — the rule of law has been re-established. The greatest benefits will accrue not to lenders and borrowers but to all those whose jobs are created because investors once again can trust that the money they've risked is safe from seizure by the state.

In the 2012 US Senate race
Shortly after losing the Chrysler case, Richard Mourdock launched a primary campaign to "retire" Dick Lugar from the United States Senate and won over Lugar by 20 points in the primaries. The unsuccessful Chrysler lawsuit was mentioned many times in his campaign, including in a TV commercial in the general election where it was stated that Mourdock "fought back... all the way to the Supreme Court."

Mourdock lost the general election to former lawsuit critic Joe Donnelly by over 5 points due to a multitude of factors.

See also
List of United States Supreme Court cases, volume 556
List of United States Supreme Court cases

References

External links
Petition of Indiana Pensioners to stay Chrysler sale order Filed with Ruth Bader Ginsburg, Associate Justice, United States Supreme Court. June 7, 2009.
Slip opinion of denial of stay, from the U.S. Supreme Court
Supreme Court ruling vacates the underlying Second Circuit opinion

Chrysler
Retirement in the United States
Economy of Indiana
Great Recession in the United States
Federal court cases involving Indiana
United States bankruptcy case law
2009 in United States case law
United States Supreme Court cases
United States Supreme Court cases of the Roberts Court